Webix is a JavaScript/HTML5/CSS3 UI toolkit for developing complex and dynamic cross-platform web applications.

Features

Webix consists of GUI controls, widgets, complex widgets and online tools: Snippet Tool, Form Builder, and Skin Builder. Webix offers Webix Jet, an open-source microframework for the convenient development of apps using the Webix components.

All widgets support drag and drop, offline storage and synchronization, dynamic data loading and paging. They can be initialized from JSON data, HTML markup, XML data, or JavaScript calls.

Webix integrates with client-side libraries and frameworks like React, Angular and Vue.js, and with the Meteor full-stack framework.

Commercial status 

There are two versions of Webix library: Webix Standard and Webix PRO.

Webix Standard is free and open-sourced under the GNU GPLv3 license, but can be used in applications distributed under the MIT, BSD and other open-source licenses via a FLOSS exception. Webix Standard includes 68 widgets and controls as well as 10 locales.

Webix PRO is available under a commercial license and includes extra functionality: 100 widgets and controls, plus 300 locales. The following features are included: additional DataTable functionality, saving and restoring application state, extra styling and customization, ability to use complex widgets: Pivot, Kanban, Spreadsheet, File Manager, and Scheduler. Complex widgets are available at extra cost.

Complex widgets 

Webix complex widgets are components that were built from smaller components of the Webix library. Beginning from February 2020, complex widgets are also built based on Webix Jet and are basically small customizable applications.

Pre-Jet complex widgets

Pivot Table 
This complex widget acts as a ready-made app for data management. Webix Pivot allows extracting information from huge datasets, exporting tables to various formats, flexible UI customization, and creating functions. The widget offers all the features necessary for effortless data management: filtering, sorting, and cell highlighting, on-the-fly configuring, structure presets, etc.

SpreadSheet 
SpreadSheet is a functional data table. It's possible to export Excel documents to it and import data in several formats:  Excel, PNG, and PDF. A user can change the number of columns and rows, create functions, and customize UI. The widget allows setting up localization and adding other Webix components. Webix SpreadSheet can be integrated with such back-end and front-end platforms like PHP, Node.js, .NET,  jQuery, AngularJS, Vue.js, React, and other libraries.

Pivot chart 
Webix Pivot chart is an effective tool for information visualization. Users can export charts in several formats: PDF, PNG, CSV, and Excel. UI customization is also available. It's possible to tune the settings, filters, configuration window, etc. Webix Pivot Chart can be integrated with several front-end and back-end platforms. The widget offers such features as filtering and sorting, clickable chart legend, on-the-fly configuring, and structure presets.

Kanban 
Webix Kanban allows compact visualization of the software development team's workflow. Users can create, modify, and delete task cards. The number of tasks and columns is unlimited. This widget offers features like drag-n-drop of cards, swimlanes, filtering, single or multiple card selection, context menu, highlighting, and custom arrangement for cards. Like other complex widgets by Webix, Kanban can be integrated with various front-end and back-end platforms.

Jet-based complex widgets 
These complex widgets are built with Webix Jet. Apart from that, they differ from other Webix widget in their logic that deals with data loading and saving: these widgets are backend-oriented. All widgets packages are provided with backend code in Golang, NodeJS or both.

File Manager 
JavaScript File Manager by Webix offers a familiar interface. Thanks to this peculiarity, a user doesn't need to spend much time learning how to use the app. Files can be uploaded via a single button click. There is also a variety of necessary features: context menu with actions, drag-n-drop of folders and files, file upload and download, quick search field, custom content modes, keyboard navigation, file preview, text editing, and loading data on request.

Document Manager 
Document Manager is an extension of File Manager. The user can edit text files and xls/xlsx sheets, view edit history and restore any version, remove files and folders into Trash, mark files as Favorite, view the list of recent files, share files with other users, tag files and folders and manage tags.

User Manager 
User Manager is a rich complex widget for managing user access rights and roles. The user can add and edit user information, assign rights to other users and group rights into roles. There are two view modes: role matrix and audit.

Chat 
Webix Chat is a powerful solution for real-time messaging. The user can send private messages or participate in group chats.

Scheduler (Calendar) 
This widget is a scheduler with two modes: full mode for desktop devices and a touch-oriented design for mobile devices. It's possible to add several types of events: one-day, long-lasting, or recurring. A user can switch different view modes, e.g., a schedule for a day, week, month, or year. Localization is also available. Mobile Scheduler by Webix offers features like custom date formats, recurring, creating, editing, and highlighting events. Like other complex widgets by Webix, Mobile Scheduler supports all modern browsers. It can be integrated with several other libraries and frameworks. This widget also follows Section 508 and WAI-ARIA standards and supports keyboard navigation.

Gantt 
This is a widget for task management. The user can create projects, tasks, and milestones, manage their time and duration. The scales in which the tasks are displayed are in range from an hour to a year. The precision with which tasks are displayed on the scale can be set and depend on the current minimal scale.

Report Manager 
This is a complex widget for creating reports in the form of datatables and charts. It allows for advanced settings of all chart parameters.

Diagram 
This is a complex widget for creating rich diagrams of different types.

UI Designer 

UI Designer is a WYSIWYG editor that allows creating interface prototypes using the Webix components. Thanks to this tool, Webix users can build the app's UI by visual means and get the resulting code. It's possible to customize all the elements, invite colleagues to work on the same project together, and download designs in several formats. Webix UI Designer is free of charge.

Snippet Tool 
Snippet Tool is a sandbox tool for writing code snippets and small application examples and sharing them. Snippet Tool also has access to the database with tagged code examples for every Webix widget, so the user can search, view and edit examples of code.

Books 
 Zammetti, Frank - Practical Webix: Learn to Expedite and Improve your Web Development (2018)

See also 

 JavaScript
 Ajax (programming)
 Comparison of JavaScript frameworks
 List of JavaScript libraries
 List of widget toolkits
 JavaScript framework
 JavaScript library

References

External links 
Webix website

JavaScript libraries
Free software